Omhajer is a town in Eritrea. It is the center of the Omhajer Subregion.

References
Subregions of Eritrea

Villages in Eritrea